Fyodor Sergeyevich Novikov (April 4, 1927 – August 25, 2008) was a Russian professional football coach and player.

References

Soviet footballers
PFC Krylia Sovetov Samara players
FC Neftyanik Ufa players
Soviet football managers
Russian football managers
FC Sokol Saratov managers
Pakhtakor Tashkent FK managers
FC Asmaral Moscow managers
FC Fakel Voronezh managers
FC Kuban Krasnodar managers
Russian Premier League managers
FC Volgar Astrakhan managers
1927 births
2008 deaths
FC Neftyanik Ufa managers
Association football defenders